The following is the list of domestic teams participating in  cricket in India in tournaments organized by the BCCI, up to the 2019–20 season.

State teams
The following is the list of Indian domestic teams representing cities, regions, states, union territories and organizations in inter-state competitions:

<div>

Status of states' representation
The following states have representation other than "One State One Team" in the competitions: 

See about:
 Andaman and Nicobar Cricket Association
 Dadra and Nagar Haveli Cricket Association
 Daman and Diu Cricket Association

National-level teams
The following is the list of Indian domestic teams representing the national level teams for domestic tournaments and tour games: 

 
Note 1: The participation records are up to 2017–18 season.
India C team is one of the national and domestic level team.

See also
 List of members of the Board of Control for Cricket in India

References

Cricket in India
Indian cricket lists